"Spin Bout U" is a song by Canadian rapper Drake and Atlanta-based rapper 21 Savage from their collaborative studio album Her Loss (2022). Produced by Banbwoi and 40, it contains samples of "Give Me Your Lovin" by Oobie. The song peaked at number five on the Billboard Hot 100.

Content
Lyrically, the song sees Drake and 21 Savage expressing their love and care for their respective partners; Savage brings up wanting to follow his lover's "Finsta". Drake reveals his opposition to the overturning of Roe v. Wade, dismissing legislators who support it as "men who never got pussy in school" and stating he will protect his partner as a result, while also rapping about making a woman famous through one phone call.

Critical reception
The song was met with a generally positive reception. Matthew Ritchie of HipHopDX called it "the best example of the pairing's chemistry" in a review of Her Loss, also writing that "The toe the line between sensitive and corny". RapReviews Steve "Flash" Juon praised the lyrics that show Drake's stance on abortion. Josh Svetz of Paste wrote, "The track lets 21 expand his range, while also putting Drake in a spot of comfort, allowing both artists to shine."

Music video
The official music video was released on February 24, 2023. Directed by Dave Meyers, it begins with the rappers lavishly enjoying themselves on a private yacht; 21 Savage raps as he prepares fruit, slicing cara cara oranges, and lights a cigar with a dollar bill, while Drake enjoys fresh ocean air on the boat's deck above. From binoculars, 21 spots a woman (played by Precious Lee) drowning in the ocean. They save her with a flotation device and bring her on board, then provide her a meal. As night falls, Drake spends time with the woman and treats her to a glass of champagne. Meanwhile, a group of women approach and enter the yacht from their boat and destroy a surveillance camera. The woman seduces Drake, tricking him into going for a kiss before blowing a white, powdered substance into his face, drugging him. The beat of the song slowly warps as Drake hallucinates and loses consciousness. Upon waking up, Drake and 21 Savage find themselves tied up and handcuffed, and it is revealed the woman they rescued is in league with the invaders. The rappers are held hostage as the crew of women ransack and vandalize the yacht, robbing their jewelry, guns, money and weed, smashing photos hanging on the wall, shooting up and eventually burning the ship. One of the pirates spray paints "His Loss" over the "Her Loss" logo of the yacht and a few of them push a helicopter overboard. With a gun to his head, Drake opens a safe and hands over his "Previous Engagements" chain, while Savage gets a heart tattoo over the dagger tattoo on his forehead. As the yacht is engulfed in flames, the women execute Drake, who falls into the sea, and shoot at Savage as he jumps off the ship in an attempt to escape. After that, the pirates drive away in their boat with the stolen luxuries from the yacht as it explodes.

Charts

References

2022 songs
Drake (musician) songs
21 Savage songs
Songs written by Drake (musician)
Songs written by 21 Savage
Songs written by 40 (record producer)
Song recordings produced by 40 (record producer)
Music videos directed by Dave Meyers (director)